Man with a Vision may refer to:
 "Man with a Vision" (song), a 1990 song by Seven
 Man with a Vision (album), a 1992 album by John Parr